Rex Wood (6 April 1906 – 1970) was a South Australian artist who lived for many years in Portugal.

History
He was born Thomas Percy Reginald Wood in Laura, South Australia, the eldest of four boys born to Rev. Tom Percy Wood and Fannie née Newbury. He was brother to Jack Newbury Wood Dean Charlton Wood and Noel Herbert Wood  who was also an artist. Their grandfather Thomas Percy Wood, also an Anglican minister in South Australia, was an accomplished watercolorist.

Wood studied painting at the South Australian School of Art under Mary Packer Harris (1891–1978), and was soon recognised as a realist in a variety of mediums. He was represented in a number of exhibitions alongside fellow artists including Ivor Hele and Hans Heysen. 

Wood began acting as art critic for The News in 1934, and his one-man exhibition in 1935 was well received. He had another exhibition in 1937, at the eve of his departure for England and the Continent. 

He studied at the Anglo-French Art Centre at St John's Wood and the Southampton Row School of Art. 
He spent much of the war years in Portugal, maintaining some contact with Australia, sending the occasional column to The News, and purchasing some works for the Art Gallery of South Australia. 
He visited Australia in the mid-1950s, and then returned to Portugal, where he died in Lisbon in 1970.

Works
 Art Gallery of New South Wales
The Hamilton Gallery of Hamilton, Victoria has a portrait Vera Van Ry by Rex Wood
The State Library of South Australia has a photograph and oil painting (1964) of Josephine Piazza "Madame Josephine", both by Rex Wood.
 National Gallery of Australia, Canberra.

References 

Australian artists
1906 births
1970 deaths
Artists from South Australia